This is a list of fires in Canada. Numbers for buildings only include those destroyed, and area is given in hectares and is converted to acres.

List

See also 
 List of Canadian disasters by death toll
 List of fires in British Columbia
 List of fires
 List of wildfires
 List of Arizona wildfires
 List of California wildfires
 List of Washington wildfires
 List of town and city fires

References 

Canada